Bunești is a commune located in Suceava County, Bukovina, northeastern Romania. It is composed of five villages: namely Bunești, Petia, Podeni, Șes, and Uncești.

References 

Communes in Suceava County
Localities in Southern Bukovina